HMS Polecat was the Pennsylvania privateer Navarro, Captain William Keeler, which  captured in March 1782. Between her commissioning on 18 July 1781 under Captain Woolman Sutton and her capture, Navarro captured two British vessels and recaptured one American vessel.

The Royal Navy purchased Navarre at Boston for £1097 3s 5d and took her into service as the 14-gun brig-sloop HMS Polecat. She was initially under the command of Lieutenant Edmund Nagle, but Lieutenant the Honourable Patrick Napier succeeded him. Two French frigates chased her off the coast of Virginia on 31 July 1782; Émeraude effected the actual capture. Polecat was taken into York River, Virginia about 13 August. Her subsequent disposition is unknown.

Notes

Citations

References
Clowes, W. Laird, et al. (1897-1903) The royal navy: a history from the earliest times to the present. (Boston: Little, Brown and Co.; London : S. Low, Marston and Co.).
 
 
 
 

Privateer ships of the United States
1780s ships
Brigs of the Royal Navy
Captured ships